Acanthochitona armata is a chiton of the surf zone endemic to Hawaiʻi.

References

 Liu, J.Y. [Ruiyu] (ed.). (2008). Checklist of marine biota of China seas. China Science Press. 1267 pp

External links
 Pilsbry, H. A. (1893-1895). Manual of conchology, structural and systematic, with illustrations of the species. Ser. 1. Vol. 15: Polyplacophora (Chitons). Acanthochitidae, Cryptoplacidae and appendix. Tectibranchiata. pp 1-463, pls 1-58

Acanthochitonidae
Endemic fauna of Hawaii
Molluscs described in 1872